Willis Chisholm Silverthorn (August 30, 1838October 7, 1916) was a Canadian American immigrant, lawyer, and politician.  He was a Wisconsin circuit court judge for 11 years and was the Democratic nominee for Governor of Wisconsin in 1896. Earlier in his life, he served two years each in the Wisconsin State Senate and the Wisconsin State Assembly.

Background and personal life
Silverthorn was born on August 30, 1838, in Toronto, Upper Canada, the son of George and Sarah (Austin) Silverthorn.  When he was three years old his family emigrated to Oakland in Jefferson County, Wisconsin, where he lived until leaving for Albion Academy, and then the University of Wisconsin. He graduated from their law school, was admitted to the Wisconsin Bar in 1863, and in 1864 moved to Wausau.  He practiced law there, and in 1869 went into the banking business with his brother George Silverthorn and Daniel L. Plumer.

Elected office
Silverthorn, a Democrat, was elected Marathon County District Attorney in 1864, and re-elected twice. In 1867 he was elected to the Assembly district which encompassed both Marathon and Wood Counties, succeeding fellow Democrat George Hiles; he was assigned to the standing committees on school and university lands, and on enrolled bills. He was succeeded for the 1869 term by another Democrat, Henry Reed.

In 1873 he was again elected to the Assembly for a one-year term (the district now consisted solely of Marathon County) to succeed his banking partner Daniel L. Plumer, this time as a "Liberal Democrat". Like Plumer, he was part of the Reform Party,  a short-lived coalition of Democrats, reform and Liberal Republicans, and Grangers formed in 1873. He was assigned to the committees on the judiciary and on elections. In 1874 he was elected to the State Senate from the 21st District (Marathon, Oconto, Shawano and Waupaca counties and parts of Outagamie County) as a Liberal Democratic/Reform candidate, with 4693 votes to 3968 for Stalwart Republican Elisha L. Bump, for a two-year term; he was assigned to the committees on the judiciary and on federal relations in the first year, moving in the next session from federal relations to the committees on banks and banking, and on privileges and elections. He was not a candidate for re-election, and was succeeded by another Liberal, Henry Mumbrue.

In 1884, with the Reform Party having collapsed, Silverthorn ran as the Democratic nominee for Attorney General of Wisconsin, coming in second to Leander Frisby in a four-way race (Frisby 162,167; Silverthorn 145,018; 8313 for Prohibitionist F. M. Angel; and 4261 for Greenbacker M. W. Stevens). In 1896, he was the Democratic nominee for governor, losing to Edward Scofield in a five-way race. in January 1897 he was the Democratic candidate for United States Senate; he was defeated by John Coit Spooner, the Republican candidate; he was also opposed by Gold Democrats such as Jesse Clason (who voted for Spooner) and Albert Solliday, who cast a protest vote for William Freeman Vilas.

In 1903, Scofield appointed Silverthorn to a Wisconsin Circuit Court seat; he was re-elected in 1904, defeating old rival Elisha Bump.

Leaving public life
Silverthorn left the judiciary in 1909 to devote his time to his private businesses, including the banking firm of Silverthorn & Plumer (which later became the First National Bank of Wausau) and the Northern Chief Iron Company.

Personal life 
In 1865, he married Maggie Virginia Myers, who came from Bowling Green, Kentucky. They had three children before her 1878 death. In 1879, he married Ida M. Single; they would have one son. Silverthorn died on October 7, 1916 in Wausau.

Electoral history

| colspan="6" style="text-align:center;background-color: #e9e9e9;"| General Election, November 3, 1896

References

1838 births
1916 deaths
19th-century American judges
American bankers
Businesspeople from Toronto
Businesspeople from Wisconsin
Pre-Confederation Canadian emigrants to the United States
Democratic Party members of the Wisconsin State Assembly
Politicians from Toronto
Politicians from Wausau, Wisconsin
Wisconsin lawyers
Wisconsin Reformers (19th century)
19th-century American politicians
Wisconsin state court judges
Democratic Party Wisconsin state senators
People from Oakland, Jefferson County, Wisconsin
19th-century American businesspeople
19th-century American lawyers